UFO: Aftershock is a real-time tactics/turn-based strategy video game developed by Altar Interactive and released by Cenega Publishing in Europe and Tri Synergy in North America in 2005. It is a squad combat game at its core with overlying strategic elements inspired by the 1994 classic X-COM: UFO Defense, though less than its own 2004 predecessor, UFO: Aftermath. It was followed by UFO: Afterlight in 2007.

Gameplay
The combat section of the game uses a real-time system with adjustable speed along with a pause option, and it has been improved from the previous game, with added features such as multilevel battlefields and accessible buildings, but also lacks some previous features, such as destructible terrain. The strategic section holds resource and squad management, research, development, some limited diplomacy and planning of attacks. As a departure from both the X-COM series and the prequel, there is no air-to-air interception.

Plot

Aftershock is set in a post-apocalyptic 2050, after the events of UFO: Aftermath. The game assumes that the player took up the Reticulans offer of resettling the most able of humanity in a space station, while allowing the rest to die, consumed by the Biomass that the Reticulans could not control. (However, in the first game the player could reject their offer, and save the Earth while defending against both the Reticulans and the Biomass.) Having lost contact with the Earth, the player must find out what happened.

Development and release
UFO: Aftershock was released in Europe on 21 October 2005 and in North America on 23 November 2005. It is protected by the controversial StarForce copy protection software on all store sold copies of the game. It was re-released by GOG.com, a digital distribution game retailer, without any copy protection.

An Xbox version was planned for release in Europe but cancelled. The publisher granted a license to the Czech company Redboss Games, a subsidiary of Redboss, which they used to create a mobile version of UFO: Aftershock.

Reception

The game received mixed critical reviews upon release. It is notoriously buggy even after several released patches.

Sequel
A sequel and third game in the series was released two years after Aftershock, titled UFO: Afterlight, to execute the same concept on Mars.

References

External links 
  via Internet Archive
 UFO: Aftershock at MobyGames

2005 video games
Cancelled Xbox games
Post-apocalyptic video games
Real-time tactics video games
Science fiction video games
Single-player video games
Turn-based strategy video games
Video games about extraterrestrial life
Video games developed in the Czech Republic
Video game sequels
Video games set in the 2050s
Windows-only games
Tri Synergy games